Pierre Vigier  (1760 in Cassaniouze (Cantal) – 19 September 1817, in Savigny-sur-Orge) was a French magistrate.

Life 
Vigier is perhaps best known for managing several public baths on the banks of the Seine (the "Bains Vigier"). The first one opened in 1791.

Vigier was a public prosecutor at Parlement until the French Revolution, when he shifted to a successful career in the business of thermal baths (in French baigneur-étuviste).

Notes 

19th-century French people
Public baths
French magistrates
1760 births
1817 deaths